The Lodner is a mountain in the Ötztal Alps in South Tyrol, Italy.

References 
 Walter Klier: Alpenvereinsführer Ötztaler Alpen, Bergverlag Rudolf Rother, München 2006. 
 Raimund von Klebelsberg: Geologie von Tirol, Verlag Gebrüder Borntraeger, Berlin 1935
 Casa Editrice Tabacco, Udine: Carta Topografica 1:25.000, Blatt 04, Schnalstal/Val Senales, Naturns/Naturno

External links 

Mountains of the Alps
Mountains of South Tyrol
Alpine three-thousanders
Ötztal Alps